Niklas Sandberg (born 18 May 1995) is a Norwegian professional footballer who plays as a midfielder for Eliteserien side Viking.

Career
He started his youth career in Lura, but later joined the city's major team Sandnes Ulf. He made his senior debut in 2014. After not being able to establish himself in the first team, he moved to Ull/Kisa in January 2017. He finished the 2017 First Division season with 11 goals and 10 assists. In April 2018, he joined Eliteserien club Start. He made his Eliteserien debut on 9 April 2018 against Lillestrøm. In January 2019, he signed a four-year contract with Haugesund. In January 2021, Viking tried to sign Sandberg, but Haugesund did not want to sell him. One year later, in January 2022, Viking succeeded in their attempt to sign Sandberg. He signed a four-year contract with the club. On 12 March 2022, he made his debut for Viking in a 2–0 cup win against Kongsvinger. One week later, Viking won 5–0 against KFUM Oslo and Sandberg scored two of the goals.

Personal life
He hails from Sandnes, and is the son of former athletes Richard Sandberg Hansen and Anne Brit Skjæveland; his mother was even an Olympian. His twin brother Joachim is an athlete.

Career statistics

References

1995 births
Living people
People from Sandnes
Norwegian twins
Twin sportspeople
Norwegian footballers
Sandnes Ulf players
Sola FK players
Nest-Sotra Fotball players
Ullensaker/Kisa IL players
IK Start players
FK Haugesund players
Viking FK players
Eliteserien players
Norwegian First Division players
Norwegian Second Division players
Association football midfielders
Sportspeople from Rogaland